Ultra Media & Entertainment Pvt. Ltd., earlier known as Ultra Distributors, is an Indian Film production company established in the year 1982. It started out in Home Video distribution and gradually forayed into film production and theatrical distribution. It is also engaged in multiple aspects of entertainment, including post production services and film distribution. Ultra has a library of over 1500 titles of award-winning and blockbuster feature films, TV dramas, animation, music and digital content. The company is into post production services such as scanning, restoration, colorization, 2D to stereoscopic 3D conversion and merchandising.

Film Production
It produced the films Yash released in 1996 and Jalpari, released in 2012.

Restoration
The company has restored and digitized classic Hindi movie Pyaasa, which was directed by Guru Dutt. As per the report, the original camera negative had come to them from the archives completely melted, with parts damaged or lost. After several clean-ups, they managed to retrieve the actual content from the original camera negative. 45 restoration experts worked for almost 4 months over 2 lakh frames (200,000). The original monaural soundtrack was remastered at 24-bit from the 35 mm optical soundtrack. The company has submitted it for the Venice Film Festival of 2015, where it was released in the Restored Classic section of the festival. Apart from Pyaasa, the company has also restored Raj Kapoor's Chori Chori, Kishore Kumar's Half Ticket and Shammi Kapoor's Dil Tera Deewana.

Subsidiaries
Apart from entertainment business company has also made a strong presence in Soft Toys market in India. Ultra Toys & Gifts Pvt Ltd is a part of the Ultra Media and Entertainment Group, which has manufacturing units at Mumbai & Noida. This company is a licensing partner of British company Smiley World in India.

References

External links
 www.ultraindia.com

Film distributors of India
Hindi cinema
Film production companies based in Mumbai
Home video distributors